Noordin Mohamed Haji, OGW, CBS (born 3 July 1973) is a Kenyan advocate of the High Court of Kenya, a position he has held for the last 21 years and the current Director of Public Prosecutions, replacing Keriako Tobiko who resigned in 2018. He is the second Director of Public Prosecutions after the promulgation of the Constitution of Kenya 2010, which made the Office an independent entity from the Attorney General's Office, which it had been previously under.

Career

Director of Public Prosecutions
Haji was appointed by H.E Uhuru Kenyatta, the President of the Republic of Kenya as the Director of Public Prosecutions (DPP) on the 28th of March, 2018 following an interview by the Public Service Commission (PSC) and vetting by the National Assembly. During his vetting speech, he would come to outline his strategic focus of Re-casting, Re-tooling and Re-learning for the ODPP. The aim of this strategy is to inject accountability, transparency, public confidence and quality control at the ODPP, ensuring an Office that is more responsive to its citizen's needs. This has been done in conjunction with the expansion of the ODPP to all the 47 counties in Kenya and a restructuring of the organisational structure.

Only two years into his position as the DPP, Haji has made a number of high-profile charges that are geared towards enhancing the fight against corruption. These charges have been against Finance Minister Henry Rotich, Migori Governor Okoth Obado, corruption charges against National Youth Service directors and the banks involved, charges against the Kenya Power Directors and Kenya pipeline employees, to name a few. These high-profile cases have earned him both admirers and critics.

One of the most impactful rulings that have been passed during Haji's tenure, is the ruling by the High Court on the 25th of July, 2019 in the case of Samburu Governor Moses Lenolkulal. The ruling stated that governors facing graft charges should step aside from their office and roles during the duration of the case. Furthermore, Section 62(6) of the Anti-Corruption and Economic Crimes Act which governors used to hang onto Office was declared unconstitutional.

Another impactful ruling was the ruling against Sirisia MP John Waluke in June 2020. Waluke was fined ksh. 727 million shillings or in default would face a 67-year jail term for the embezzling of Ksh. 300 million public funds through a maize scandal.

Honours and awards
On 12 December 2012, during the 49th Jamhuri Day celebrations, Haji received the Order of the Grand Warrior of Kenya (OGW) by the then President of the Republic of Kenya, Mwai Kibaki for distinguished services to the nation. Later on, on 12 December 2018, he also received the Chief of the Order of the Burning Spear (CBS) by H.E Uhuru Kenyatta, the President of the Republic of Kenya for his distinguished efforts in the fight against graft.

In recognition of Haji's role as the DPP, he has received numerous awards which include the 2019 Leadership Integrity Award given to him by the Action for Transparency, the Kenyan subsidiary of Transparency International, 2019 Star Person of the Year Award by the Star, and the 2019 Distinguished Taxpayers Award by H.E President Uhuru Kenyatta, among others.

References 

1973 births
Living people
Ethnic Somali people
Kenyan Muslims
Kenyan people of Somali descent
People from Garissa County
Australian National University alumni
Alumni of Cardiff University